Redford High School was a secondary school in Detroit, Michigan. A part of Detroit Public Schools, the school opened in September 1921 and ceased operations in June 2007. Staffed and operated by the Detroit Public Schools; Redford High School served the sub-communities of Old Redford, Grandmont, Rosedale Park and Brightmoor.

History
Chastity Pratt of the Detroit Free Press wrote, "when it was built, Redford was the jewel of the district." Redford offered university preparatory classes for its students such as Business Law and Fashion merchandising to mention a few.

In December 2006, the Detroit Public School District announced that it planned to close Redford; concerned alumni and parents mounted a valiant yet unsuccessful drive to prevent the closure. In 2007, the school's third floor was empty. The property was purchased by Meijer, Inc., as a site for a future store complex; the high school facilities were demolished in September 2012.

Detroit's Cooley and Cody High School absorbed much of the attendance area from Redford; including Brightmoor and Grandmont. Henry Ford High School assumed jurisdiction over the remaining northern neighborhoods.

In June 2015 a Meijer store opened on the Redford site. As of 2015 it was Meijer's second Detroit location. This store uses stonework from the former Redford building.

Athletics
The golf team won three consecutive Michigan High School Athletic Association championships (1928, '29, '30).

Notable alumni
 Tonya Mosley. American Journalist
 Mathis Bailey,  American-Canadian author and fiction writer
 Kevin Belcher NFL player
 Marc Cayce, American film writer, director and producer
 Ralph Clayton, former professional American football player
 Michael Dunn, actor
 Raymond D. Dzendzel, was an American politician who was a Democratic member of both houses of the Michigan Legislature between 1955 and 1970
 Gene Hamlin, former American football center in the National Football League
 Dion Harris (basketball), professional basketball player 
 Manny Harris, NBA player 
 Archie Matsos, retired American football linebacker
 Edward H. McNamara, Wayne county executive
 Michael Netzer, American-Israeli artist best known for his comic book work for DC Comics and Marvel Comics in the 1970s
 Douglas Ramsay, figure skater; died before graduating
 Gary Reed, comics writer 
 Triette Reeves, American politician and minister
 Clarke Scholes, American competitive swimmer and Olympic champion
 George C. Scott, actor 
 Hal Smith, Major League Baseball catcher 1955-1964 and 1960 World Series hero with Pittsburgh Pirates
 Greg Theakston, American comics artist and illustrator
 Ken Wilson, American sportscaster, known primarily for his many years as a play-by-play announcer of National Hockey League and Major League Baseball games
 Bill Zepp, major league baseball pitcher

References

External links

 Redford High School - Detroit Public Schools
 Welcome to Redford High School - Detroit Public Schools
 Inside the abandoned Redford High School

Former high schools in Michigan
Educational institutions disestablished in 2007
2007 disestablishments in Michigan
Defunct schools in Michigan
High schools in Detroit
1921 establishments in Michigan
 
Detroit Public Schools Community District
Buildings and structures demolished in 2012